is a near-Earth asteroid estimated to be roughly  in diameter. It is a fast rotating asteroid of the Apollo group which was first observed  by the Mount Lemmon Survey on 28 February 2016, just days before it passed Earth at 1 lunar distance (LD) on 3 March 2016. The elongated fast rotator has a rotation period of 303 seconds.

Orbit 

 orbits the Sun at a distance of 0.7–3.0 AU once every 2 years and 6 months (913 days; semi-major axis of 1.84 AU). Its orbit has a high eccentricity of 0.63 and an inclination of 3° with respect to the ecliptic. Due to its eccentric orbit,  is also a Mars-crosser, crossing the orbit of the Red Planet at 1.66 AU.

2016 discovery 

The last optical image was at 3 March 2016 03:08 UT. Bistatic Solar System Radar (GSSR) with DSS-13 and the Green Bank Observatory were used to image the asteroid.

2021 approach 
It was recovered on 17 February 2021 by Pan-STARRS when the uncertainty in the asteroid's sky position covered about 1.2° of the sky.

By early February 2021 the asteroid was brighter than apparent magnitude 24, which still placed it near the limiting magnitude of even the best automated astronomical surveys. It came to opposition (opposite the Sun in the sky) around 26 February 2021 at around magnitude 19. On 3 March 2021 it passed  from Earth. It was not listed on the Sentry Risk Table because the line of variation (LOV) did not pass through where Earth will be.

Physical characteristics

Rotation period 

On the following night, European astronomers Siegfried Eggl, William Thuillot, Maria Kudryashova, and Raoul Behrend determined a similar period of  hours (or 303.7 seconds) and an even higher amplitude of  magnitude.().

Diameter 

The diameter can only be estimated. Since the near-Earth population shows a bimodal distribution with two albedo-peaks at 0.25 and 0.05,  may measure  in diameter, for a corresponding stony and carbonaceous composition, respectively.

Notes

References

External links 
 
 
 
 DSS13-GBT Radar Images of 2016 DV1

Minor planet object articles (unnumbered)
Discoveries by MLS
Radar-imaged asteroids

20210302
20160302